Daviess County High School is located in Owensboro, Kentucky, United States. It is one of the largest schools in the area, with roughly 1750 students. It is part of the Daviess County Public Schools system. Its sister school is Apollo High School. Daviess County Middle School and College View Middle School feed into Daviess County High School.

Notable alumni
 Joseph R. Bowen, Kentucky state legislator
 Wayne Chapman, former professional American Basketball Association player
 Donald Douglas, physician and member of the Kentucky Senate
 Wendell Ford, former governor of Kentucky and U.S. senator
 Tyrone Hopson, former NFL lineman for San Francisco 49ers and Detroit Lions
 Jeremy Mayfield, former NASCAR driver
 Larry Vanover, Major League Baseball umpire
 Darrell Waltrip, three time NASCAR Cup (then Winston Cup) champion

References

Buildings and structures in Owensboro, Kentucky
Schools in Daviess County, Kentucky
Public high schools in Kentucky